Valley Forge is an unincorporated community in Carter County, Tennessee. Located along US Route 19E/321 and SR-67, south of Elizabethton and north of Hampton.

Education
Schools in Valley Forge are operated by Carter County Schools:

Located across the Doe river from "Crow Bottom" up on a hill is Valley Forge Elementary School. Established around 1870, then in an old log cabin church. The current structure was built in 1926.

It serves children in the community grades PK - 5.

Hampton-Valley Forge Volunteer Fire Department
Hampton-Valley Forge Volunteer Fire Department serves the communities of Hampton and Valley Forge and surrounding areas. They have 2 stations, one (not in operation) across highway 19E from Greer's Grocery in Valley Forge and the second off of Church St in Hampton. 

As of early 2021, Hampton-Valley Forge Volunteer Fire Department acquired land at the entrance of Simerly Creek Rd to build a third station. This will allow for quicker response times and lower homeowner insurance rates for families in the community.

References

Unincorporated communities in Carter County, Tennessee
Unincorporated communities in Tennessee